Route 33 is a highway in western Missouri.  Its northern terminus is at Route 6 in Maysville; its southern terminus is at U.S. Route 69 in Liberty.

Route 33 is one of the original 1922 state highways.  Its northern terminus was at Route 8 (now U.S. Route 136) in southern DeKalb County.  At Plattsburg, it turned west (modern Route 116) and then south on current U.S. Route 169.

A branch route, Route 33A, left the former alignment and connected it with Lathrop.  This branch is now part of the highway itself.

Major intersections

References

033
Transportation in Clay County, Missouri
Transportation in DeKalb County, Missouri